Andrzej Edward "Eddie" Niedzwiecki; born 3 May 1959) is a Welsh football coach and former footballer who played as a goalkeeper. He is currently assistant manager of AFC Wimbledon.

After retiring early due to injury Niedzwiecki became a coach with Chelsea and then Arsenal before working alongside Mark Hughes with the Wales national team. Since then he has worked with Hughes at Blackburn Rovers, Manchester City, Fulham, Queens Park Rangers, Stoke City and Southampton.

Playing career
Starting his playing career with Wrexham at the age of 14, Niedzwiecki won the Third Division title of 1978 with the side. He stayed with the club until the summer of 1983, when he was signed for Chelsea by former Wrexham manager, John Neal. He quickly won a regular place in the Chelsea starting line-up and was impressive as the side won the Second Division title in his first season. He also earned two caps for Wales during his playing career.

Coaching career
Niedzwiecki was forced to retire aged 28, after battling numerous injuries. He later became a coach at Chelsea, eventually leaving the club in November 2000 after the arrival of new boss Claudio Ranieri. Niedzwiecki then linked up shortly after with Arsenal, succeeding the late George Armstrong as reserve team coach. He also worked as a part-time coach with Wales, under new manager Mark Hughes during this time. In September 2004, he joined Blackburn Rovers, again under Hughes, as a first-team coach. When Hughes left for Manchester City four years later, he was among several at Blackburn who followed him to Manchester.

However, on 19 December 2009 Hughes and his backroom staff were relieved of their duties at the Sky Blues. Niedzwiecki once again linked up as a coach with Hughes in 2010 at Fulham. He left the club in the summer of 2011 alongside Hughes. In 2012, he joined Queens Park Rangers' as a member of the coaching staff, after Hughes was appointed as the side's manager. He together with Mark Bowen were briefly appointed as joint caretaker managers after Hughes' dismissal in November 2012. Niedzwiecki then went on to join up with Hughes at Stoke City in June 2013. He left Stoke in January 2018.

In March 2018, he was appointed assistant first-team coach at Southampton, following the appointment of Hughes as manager. In May 2018, after Southampton's Premier League status was confirmed, it was announced that Niedzwiecki had signed a new long-term contract. On 3 December 2018, he was dismissed following the sacking of Mark Hughes.

In October 2019, Eddie was pictured with new Reading F.C. Boss Mark Bowen it was later confirmed that Eddie had joined up with former Mark Hughes assistant Mark Bowen as an Assistant manager at Reading.

In March 2022, following Bowen's appointment at AFC Wimbledon, Niedzwiecki was appointed assistant manager of the League One club.

Career statistics

As a player
Sourced from 

A.  The "Other" column constitutes appearances and goals in the Full Members Cup.

As a manager

Honours
Wrexham
 Football League Third Division champions: 1977–78

Chelsea
 Football League Second Division champions: 1983–84

References

External links

1959 births
Living people
Footballers from Bangor, Gwynedd
Welsh people of Polish descent
Welsh footballers
Association football goalkeepers
Wrexham A.F.C. players
Chelsea F.C. players
Wales international footballers
Arsenal F.C. non-playing staff
Blackburn Rovers F.C. non-playing staff
Chelsea F.C. non-playing staff
Queens Park Rangers F.C. non-playing staff
Southampton F.C. non-playing staff
Wales national football team non-playing staff
Stoke City F.C. non-playing staff
Manchester City F.C. non-playing staff
Queens Park Rangers F.C. managers
Stoke City F.C. managers
Welsh football managers
AFC Wimbledon non-playing staff